Eagle Nest Creek is a stream in the U.S. state of South Dakota.

Eagle Nest Creek was named for the fact eagles nested near its course.

See also
List of rivers of South Dakota

References

Rivers of Jackson County, South Dakota
Rivers of South Dakota